Club Athlétique Bordeaux-Bègles Gironde are a French multisports club, established in 1907, based in Bègles, in the southern suburbs of Bordeaux. Their rugby union section, Union Bordeaux Bègles is their flagship. They play in blue and white chequered shirts, hence their nickname Les Damiers (the draught-boards).

The club now only has youth teams, although the club's website documents the result of the new team thoroughly. The club has always played at Stade André-Moga, which holds 10,000.

History
CABBG were the main team of the Bordeaux area for most of the 20th century. They remained in the first division from 1913 to 2003 and won two French championships (1969, 1991) along the way. Along the years, the club's name changed. It started as Club Athlétique Bègles, then became CA Bègles-Bordeaux Gironde in 1983, then CA Bordeaux-Bègles Gironde in 1988.

CABBG were relegated from the First Division for the first time in 2003, after the professional league's finance commission declared them unable to continue. A year later, the club was declared bankrupt and forced to play in the amateur third division (Fédérale 1). Finally, in 2006, their senior outfit was merged with that of Stade Bordelais, which played in the professional second division Pro D2 so as to create a side that would be able to jump back to the first division (Top 14). The new team was clumsily called Union Stade Bordelais-Club Athlétque Bordeaux-Bègles Gironde or Bordeaux Rugby Métropole but in 2008 changed to Union Bordeaux Bègles.

Honors
 French championship : 1969, 1991
 Runner-up French championship : 1967

Finals results

Famous players

 Lisandro Arbizu
 Carlos Ignacio Fernández Lobbe
 Federico Méndez
 Morgan Williams
 Guy Accoceberry
 Philippe Bernat-Salles
 Olivier Brouzet
 Jacques Chaban-Delmas
 Patrice Collazo
 Michel Courtiols
 Thierry Devergie
 Richard Dourthe
 Thierry Dusautoir
 Philippe Gimbert
 Jean-Baptiste Lafond
 Patrice Lagisquet
 Bernard Laporte
 Christophe Laussucq
 Vincent Moscato
 Marc de Rougemont
 Marc Sallefranque
 Serge Simon
 Olivier Sourgens
 Jean-Marc Souverbie
 William Téchoueyres
 Ludovic Valbon
 David Bortolussi
 Luca Martin
 Gabriel Brezoianu
 Alexandru Manta

External links
 Official website

Begles
Rugby clubs established in 1907
Begles Gironde
Sport in Gironde
1907 establishments in France